Les Liaisons dangereuses is a French epistolary novel by Choderlos de Laclos.

Les Liaisons dangereuses may also refer to:
 Les liaisons dangereuses (film), a 1959 film adapted by Claude Brulé and directed by Roger Vadim
Les Liaisons Dangereuses 1960, the soundtrack by Art Blakey and the Jazz Messengers with Barney Wilen for the above film
 Les Liaisons Dangereuses (play), a 1985 play adapted by Christopher Hampton
 Les Liaisons dangereuses (TV miniseries), a 2003 TV miniseries adapted by Eric-Emmanuel Schmitt
 Liaisons Dangereuses (band), a German electropunk band from the early 1980s and their eponymous 1981 album

See also 
Dangerous Liaisons (disambiguation)

he:יחסים מסוכנים